Fabian Hevia is an Australian jazz percussionist. He has played with The Catholics and Vince Jones.

Discography
1996 Here's To The Miracles Vince Jones

References

External links
Wanderlust
Strictly Dancing
Jazz Workshop Australia
Jazz and Beyond
Blind Date movie crew

Living people
Australian jazz percussionists
University of Wollongong alumni
Year of birth missing (living people)
The Catholics members
Wanderlust (jazz band) members